John Dowse may refer to:
 John Dowse (rugby union, born 1891) (1891–1964), Irish-born British Army medical officer and rugby union player
 John Henry Dowse (born 1935), Australian rugby union player
 John Dowse (priest), Irish Anglican priest